The canton of Hœnheim is an administrative division of the Bas-Rhin department, northeastern France. It was created at the French canton reorganisation which came into effect in March 2015. Its seat is in Hœnheim.

It consists of the following communes:

Eckbolsheim
Hœnheim
Lampertheim
Mittelhausbergen
Mundolsheim
Niederhausbergen
Oberhausbergen
Reichstett
Souffelweyersheim
Wolfisheim

References

Cantons of Bas-Rhin